Bärbel Wartenberg-Potter (also known as Bärbel von Wartenberg-Potter) (born 1943) is a German theologian. In 2001 she began a seven-year term as the third woman serving as a Bishop of a Lutheran Church in Germany.

Biography
Bärbel Wartenberg was born on 16 September 1943 in Pirmasens, Rhenish Palatinate, Germany. In 1963, she began her university education graduating in 1968 with a master's degree in German languages and literature and a teaching degree. Wartenberg passed her theological examination for the Lutheran Evangelical Church in Württemberg. Between 1970 and 1972, she participated in mission and development work with the Evangelical-Catholic Association. The experience with both her children dying young (7 months and 2 years old) from an autoimmune disease made her campaign the initiative „Kind im Krankenhaus“ (i.e. child in the hospital) between 1974 and 1976 in order to allow parents staying with their hospitalised children. Her first marriage broke down in grief and pain. Attaining her master's degree in Theology, in 1976, she became the director at the Centre for Development Education in Stuttgart. She was ordained as a pastor in 1980 and served as a regional pastor in Württemberg for three years. Between 1983 and 1986 she was the director of the Programme for Women in Church and Society of the World Council of Churches (WCC) in Geneva, Switzerland. During that time, in 1985, she married Philip Potter, a minister and theologian who was the Secretary General of the WCC.

After her second marriage, and until 1990, Wartenberg-Potter taught at the United Theological College of the West Indies in Kingston, Jamaica. In 1991, she returned to Germany and served as a parish pastor in Stuttgart-Botnang through 1996. In 1997, she became president of the Council of Christian Churches in Germany (ACKD) in Frankfurt. In 2000, she was elected as a bishop of the Holstein-Lübeck diocese for the North Elbian Evangelical Lutheran Church. Her election was the third of a woman in Germany to the position of Lutheran bishop and she was assigned to the Lübeck Cathedral. Wartenberg-Potter assumed the post in 2001 and retired in 2008. In 2009, she joined the Institute for Theological Zoology as the Chairman of the Board of Trustees.

Selected works

References 

1943 births
Living people
German Lutheran theologians
Women Lutheran bishops
21st-century German Protestant theologians
Women Christian theologians
20th-century German women writers
People from Pirmasens
20th-century German writers
21st-century German women writers
21st-century German writers
21st-century German Lutheran bishops